John Bryn Williams (born 1977), known as John B, is an English disc jockey and electronic music producer. He is widely recognised for his eccentric clothing and wild hair and his production of several cutting edge drum and bass tracks.

John B ranked number 76 in DJ Magazines 2010 Top 100 DJs annual poll, announced on 27 October 2010.

Career
Williams was born on 12 July 1977 in Maidenhead, Berkshire. He started producing music around the age of 14, and now is the head of drum and bass record label Beta Recordings, together with its more specialist drum and bass sub-labels Nu Electro, Tangent, and Chihuahua. He also has releases on Formation Records, Metalheadz and Planet Mu. Williams was ranked 92nd drum and bass DJ on the 2009 DJ Magazine top 100.

Style
While his trademark sound has evolved through the years, it generally involves female vocals and trance-like synths (a style which has been dubbed "trance and bass", "trancestep" and "futurestep" by listeners). His most recent concentration is a 1980s electroclash influenced fusion of electro and drum and bass, which was dubbed 'electrostep'. At first (around early 2002), this style seemed odd and comical to some in the drum and bass community. However, this move has given John the ability to carry his style of drum and bass forward. He has dabbled in darkstep, jazzstep and various other styles in his time. When he DJs, he is known to spin both drum and bass and electro house, sometimes with other genres such as disco and rock, in the same sets.

Discography
Visions (1997)
Catalyst (1999)
Future Reference (2001)
Brainstorm (2002)
Mercury Skies (2003)
In:transit (2004)
American Girls (2004)
Electrostep (2006)
To Russia With Love (2008) (MixCD)
Light Speed (2012)
The Killada (2022)

References

External links
John B Official Homepage
John B Podcast
Beta Recordings' Website

1977 births
Living people
Club DJs
English drum and bass musicians
Alumni of Van Mildert College, Durham
People from Maidenhead
Planet Mu artists